Saccopsidae is a family of copepods belonging to the order Cyclopoida.

Genera:
 Euchonicola Boxshall, O'Reilly, Sikorski & Summerfield, 2019
 Euchonicoloides Boxshall, O'Reilly, Sikorski & Summerfield, 2019
 Lanassicola Boxshall, O'Reilly, Sikorski & Summerfield, 2019
 Melinnacheres Sars, 1870
 Trichobranchicola Boxshall, O'Reilly, Sikorski & Summerfield, 2019

References

Copepods